Museo de Bellas Artes may refer to:

National art museums
 Museo Nacional de Bellas Artes (Buenos Aires), Argentina
 Museu Nacional de Belas Artes, Brazil
 Museo Nacional de Bellas Artes (Santiago de Chile), Chile
 Museo Nacional de Bellas Artes de La Habana, Cuba
 Museo de Bellas Artes (Caracas), Venezuela

Municipal art museums
 Museo de Bellas Artes (Bilbao), Spain
 Museo de Bellas Artes (Córdoba), Spain
 Museo de Bellas Artes (Málaga), Spain
 Museo de Bellas Artes (Murcia), Spain
 Museo de Bellas Artes (Santander), Spain
 Museo de Bellas Artes de Sevilla, Spain
 Museo de Bellas Artes de Valencia, Spain

See also
Palacio de Bellas Artes, Mexico City
Museum of Fine Arts (disambiguation)